Smoking Joe or Smokin' Joe is a nickname of:

 Joe Frazier (1944–2011), Olympic and world heavyweight boxing champion
 Smokin' Joe Kubek (1956–2015), blues musician
 Smokin' Joe Misiti (born 1974), Australian footballer
 Smokin Joe Robinson (born 1991), Australian guitarist
 Smokin' Joe Stanley (born 1957), New Zealand former rugby player

See also
 Smokin' (disambiguation)
 Smokey Joe (disambiguation)
 Smokin' Joe's, an Indian chain of pizzerias 

Lists of people by nickname